Liede Subdistrict is a subdistrict in Tianhe District, Guangzhou, China. It was established in 1999.

History
The street has an old village called "Liede Village". But the reconstruction work of the village started in 2007. The village site will be replaced by new residential and commercial buildings of Zhujiang New Town. The village is an "experimental pioneer" in redevelopment, with particular attention being paid to villagers' wishes.

Besides, there is a sewage treatment plant in the area, which is the second largest in Guangzhou.

There is a Guangzhou Metro station in the area, called "Liede Station".

See also
Liede Station

References

External links
Official site of Liede Street 
Liede Online 

Populated places established in 1999
Tianhe District
Township-level divisions of Guangdong
1999 establishments in China
Subdistricts of the People's Republic of China